Vore may refer to:
-vore, a Latin suffix related to eating
Vorarephilia, a typically erotic desire or sexual fantasy to be consumed or to consume another
A monster, also known as Shalrath, in the 1996 video game Quake
Vorë, a commune in Albania